Alfred Cumming is the name of:

 Alfred Cumming (governor) (1802–1873), Governor of the U.S. Territory of Utah from 1858 to 1861
 Alfred Cumming (general) (1829–1910), Confederate General in American Civil War 
Alfred Cumming II from the Battle of Antietam